Empress Dowager Liang (梁太后) may refer to:

Liang Na (116–150), empress dowager of the Han dynasty
Empress Gongsu (died 1085), empress dowager of the Western Xia dynasty during Emperor Huizong (Li Bingchang)'s reign
Empress Zhaojian (died 1099), empress dowager of the Western Xia dynasty during Emperor Chongzong (Li Qianshun)'s reign

See also
Empress Liang (disambiguation)

Liang